Eudonia oreas is a moth in the family Crambidae. It was named by Edward Meyrick in 1884. This species is endemic to New Zealand.

The wingspan is about 22 mm. The forewings are white, mixed with pale grey and thinly irrorated with dark fuscous. There are some obscure dark fuscous spots near the base. The first line is white, margined with dark fuscous posteriorly. The second line is white, margined with dark fuscous. The hindwings are grey-whitish with a slightly darker apex. Adults have been recorded on wing in December.

References

Moths described in 1884
Eudonia
Moths of New Zealand
Endemic fauna of New Zealand
Taxa named by Edward Meyrick
Endemic moths of New Zealand